This is a list of all extant genera, species, and subspecies of the snakes of the family Pythonidae, otherwise referred to as pythonids or true pythons. It follows the taxonomy currently provided by ITIS,which is based on the continuing work of Roy McDiarmidand has been updated with additional recently described species.

 Antaresia, Children's pythons
 Antaresia childreni, Children's python, large-blotched python, eastern large-blotched python or banded rock python
 Antaresia maculosa, spotted python, small-blotched python, eastern small-blotched python or eastern Children's python
 Antaresia maculosa maculosa, southern spotted python
 Antaresia maculosa peninsularis, Cape York spotted python
 Anteresia papuensis, Papuan spotted python
 Antaresia perthensis, pygmy python or anthill python
 Apodora, Papuan python
 Apodora papuana, Papuan python, Irian python or Papuan olive python
 Aspidites, pitless pythons
 Aspidites melanocephalus, black-headed python
 Aspidites ramsayi, woma python, woma, Ramsay's python or sand python
 Bothrochilus, Bismarck ringed python
 Bothrochilus boa, Bismarck ringed python
 Leiopython, white-lipped pythons
 Leiopython albertisii, D'Albertis' python or northern white-lipped python
 Leiopython biakensis, Biak white-lipped python
 Leiopython fredparkeri, Karimui Basin white-lipped python
 Liasis, water pythons
 Liasis fuscus, water python
 Liasis mackloti, Macklot's python or freckled python
 Liasis mackloti dunni, Dunn's python or Dunn's freckled python
 Liasis mackloti mackloti, Macklot's python or Macklot's freckled python
 Liasis mackloti savuensis, Savu python or Savu freckled python
 Liasis olivaceus, olive python
 Liasis olivaceus barroni, Pilbara olive python
 Liasis olivaceus olivaceus, common olive python
 Malayopython, reticulated python and Timor python
 Malayopython reticulatus, reticulated python
 Malayopython reticulatus jamperanus, Kayaudi reticulated python or Tanahjampean reticulated python
 Malayopython reticulatus reticulatus, Asiatic reticulated python
 Malayopython reticulatus saputrai, Selayer reticulated python
 Malayopython timoriensis, Timor python
 Morelia, tree pythons
 Morelia azurea, northern green tree python
 Morelia azurea azurea
 Morelia azurea pulcher
 Morelia azurea utaraensis
 Morelia bredli, Bredl's python, Bredl's carpet python or Centralian python
 Morelia carinata, rough-scaled python
 Morelia imbricata, southwestern carpet python 
 Morelia spilota, carpet python or diamond python
 Morelia spilota cheynei, jungle carpet python
 Morelia spilota mcdowelli, eastern carpet python, coastal carpet python or McDowell's carpet python
 Morelia spilota metcalfei, Murray-Darling carpet python, inland carpet python, riverine carpet python or Victorian carpet python
 Morelia spilota spilota, diamond python
 Morelia spilota variegata, Torresian carpet python, Darwin carpet python, northwestern carpet python or rubber python 
 Morelia viridis, southern green tree python
 Nyctophilopython, Oenpelli python
 Nyctophilopython oenpelliensis, Oenpelli python or Oenpelli rock python
 Python, true pythons sensu stricto
 Python anchietae, Angolan python
 Python bivittatus, Burmese python
 Python bivittatus bivittatus, giant Burmese python
 Python bivittatus progschai, dwarf Burmese python
 Python breitensteini, Borneo python or Borneo short-tailed python
 Python brongersmai, blood python or Brongersma's short-tailed python
 Python curtus, Sumatran short-tailed python
 Python kyaiktiyo, Myanmar short-tailed python
 Python molurus, Indian python, Indian rock python, Asian rock python or black-tailed python
 Python natalensis, Southern African rock python
 Python regius, ball python or royal python
 Python sebae, Central African rock python
 Simalia, amethystine python species complex
 Simalia amethistina, amethystine python or scrub python
 Simalia boeleni, Boelen's python or black python
 Simalia clastolepis, Moluccan python
 Simalia kinghorni, Australian scrub python
 Simalia nauta, Tanimbar python
 Simalia tracyae, Halmahera python

References

 
Pythonidae
Pythonidae
Pythonidae